Orchard Hills may refer to:
Fountainhead-Orchard Hills, Maryland, a census-designated place in Maryland
Orchard Hills, New South Wales, a suburb in New South Wales
Orchard Hills, a village in Irvine, California

See also
Orchard Hill (disambiguation)